Jeremiah Best (22 August 1897 – 1955) was an English professional footballer who made over 220 appearances as a goalkeeper in the Football League for Coventry City. He also played League football for Rotherham United and Halifax Town.

Personal life 
Best served in the British Army during the First World War.

Career statistics

References

English footballers
English Football League players
British Army personnel of World War I
1897 births
1955 deaths
People from County Durham (before 1974)
Association football goalkeepers
Coventry City F.C. players
Halifax Town A.F.C. players
Rotherham United F.C. players
Worksop Town F.C. players
Newark Town F.C. players
Footballers from Tyne and Wear